Nupserha deusta is a species of beetle in the family Cerambycidae. It was described by Dalman in 1817.

Subspecies
 Nupserha deusta deusta (Dalman, 1817)
 Nupserha deusta testacea Aurivillius, 1914

References

deusta
Beetles described in 1817